The Young Left (JL) is an independent youth organization in Austria that is working closely with the KPÖ.

Political positions 
The association sees itself as clearly politically left and part of the communist movement and describes itself as "the only nationwide youth organization that is working on building a strong left-wing force". The Young Left strives for a "solidary society" that is free from poverty and discrimination.

Organization 
The Young Left is organized in district groups and national organizations. The pioneering political and strategic decisions of the federal organization are made at the annual federal congress, at which all members are entitled to vote. The federal congress also elects the federal board, the executive body of the young left. The work of the federal board is controlled by the federal committee, which consists of delegates from the state and district divisions and is confirmed by the federal congress.

History 

The Young Left were founded in Linz in June 2018. They represent the successor organization of the Young Greens and initially symbolized the end of the developments around the youth of Austria's Greens, who separated from their youth organization in spring 2017 - a new party youth organization of the Greens, the “Green Youth - Green alternative youth ”. Sarah Pansy was elected as the political director, in addition to her and Flora Petrik, five other members belonged to the board of directors. After the Young Greens split off from the Green Party, many members of the Young Greens were also members of the new organization Young Left. In addition, the existing association Junge Linke was merged into the new organization, which previously had active groups mainly in Lower Austria, Upper Austria, and Vienna.

In the summer of 2018, the first regional organizations such as those in Lower Austria, Upper Austria, Salzburg, Styria and Vienna were founded.

In March 2018, the former Junge Linke member Kay-Michael Dankl gained 3.7% of the votes in the Salzburg municipal council elections for the KPÖ and thus received a mandate. On May 8th he was sworn in as a member of the parish council.

See also 

 Socialist Youth Austria
 Communist Youth Austria
 Left Youth Solid (Germany)
 European Network of Democratic Young Left (former European network)

External links 

 Official website of the Young Left
 Young Left Podcast

References 

2018 establishments
Communist Party of Austria
Youth organisations based in Austria